The Canterbury, and Nelson-Marlborough and West Coast Regiment was a Territorial Force (Army Reserve) unit of the New Zealand Army.

Formation and recent history
The regiment was formed in 1964 during the reorganisation of the army by the amalgamation of two separate regiments: the Canterbury Regiment and the Nelson, Marlborough, West Coast Regiment. In turn, those two regiments had originally been formed from the 1st (Canterbury) & 2nd (South Canterbury) and the 12th (Nelson and Marlborough) & 13th (North Canterbury and Westland) Regiments which had been initially raised in the early 1900s, following the formation of gazetted militia units in 1859.

The 1964 amalgamation saw the new Territorial Force battalion become the Second Battalion of the Royal New Zealand Infantry Regiment. This was until the later reorganisation of 1999, which saw the Territorial Force battalions split from the RNZIR to become multi-function battalion groups. The 2nd Battalion (Canterbury, and Nelson-Marlborough and West Coast) RNZIR became the 2nd Canterbury (Nelson, Marlborough, West Coast) Battalion Group, with the following sub-unit types:

Companies
A Company: Greymouth*,
B Company: Christchurch,
C Company: Timaru, 
D Company: Nelson Company, 
Support Company: Christchurch, Blenheim and Ashburton,
Logistics Company

Artillery

Engineers

Medical

Signals

Transport

Brass Band

In December 2012, 2nd Canterbury (Nelson, Marlborough, West Coast) Battalion Group merged with 4th Otago and Southland Battalion Group to form 2/4 Battalion.

Which now consists of 3 Companies:
A Company
B Company
C Company

Predecessor units

1845-Nelson
The Nelson Battalion of Militia was the first NZ Army Unit formed in the South Island and one of the first in New Zealand. The Battalion had two companied each of 50 min. the Commandant was Captain Donald Sinclair (Nelson Magistrate). His appointment and those of eight other officers was gazetted on 28 August 1845 (Gaz24/45 page 114). 
The Gazetted Officers were:

Captains      
Donald Sinclair
John D. Greenwood
David Monro
Lieutenants    
Thomas Renwick
Francis Dillon Bell
Ensigns        
Charles Thrope
Alexander le Grand Campbell
Quartermaster  
Henry Symour
Adjutant       
Richard Newcombe

The Colonial Secretary's records show that Mr Fox was offered a Captaincy but declined as Mr Sinclair would be in command. Mr Joseph Ford Wilson was offered and accepted a commission as Surgeon on 9 June 1845 but for some reason this was not gazetted.

Hourly parades were held daily at 7am, 10am and 4pm.  Uniforms were supplied (blue shirt, sailor type pattern). Arms were old flint-lock muskets-the weapons that had been imported for bartering with the Maoris.

Dress distinctions

The Second Militia Act 1858

Volunteer Corps of Canterbury Rifles
 Number 1-Christchurch
 Number 2-Christchurch
 Number 3-Lyttelton
 Number 4-Lyttelton
 Number 5-Kaiapoi
 Number 6-Southern Volunteer Rifles (Name changed to Forest Rifle Volunteers on 19 April 1861)

On 8 April 1865 the Christchurch City Guards were formed. Then in 1911 it became the 1st Canterbury Regiment, thus providing an unbroken link.

Volunteer Corps of Nelson Rifles
 Number 1 Coy-Nelson City
 Number 2 Coy-Nelson City
 Number 3 Coy-Was not gazetted until /9/06/1862
 Number 4 Coy-Suburban North
 Number 5 Coy-Motueka
 Number 6 Coy-Waimea East
 Number 7 Coy-Waimea South
 Number 8 Coy-Nelson

Marlborough Rifle Volunteers
 Number 1 Coy-Marlborough Rifles
 Number 2 Coy-Picton Rangers

Nelson 1862
Eight Companies were reduced to five:
 Number 1 City
 Number 2 Waimea East
 Number 3 Waimea South
 Number 4 Motueka
 Number 5 Nelson

In Marlborough two Companies were reduced to one: the Marlborough Rangers.

Commanders

Canterbury District Commanders 1859–1910

Maj H.A. Scott 1859–1861
Col T. Wollaston-White 1861–1867
Maj G. Packe 1867
Lt Col H.E. Reader 1867–1868
Lt Col G. Packe 1868–1882
Lt Col A. Lean 1882–1891
Lt Col H. Gordon 1891–1901
Lt Col W.H. Webb 1901–1903
Col C.W. Porter, CB. 1903–1904
Lt Col A. Bauchop, CMG. 1904–1906
Lt Col J.E. Hawkins, VD. 1906–1910

1st Battalion Canterbury Rifle Volunteers

Lt Col A.G.D. Toswill 1886–1888 (99th Regt)

Canterbury Battalion and later North Canterbury Battalion

Lt Col F.W. Francis, VD. 1895–1903

South Canterbury Battalion of Infantry Volunteers

Lt Col W.M. Moore 1897

1st North Canterbury Battalion of Infantry

Lt Col W.A. Day 1903–1906
Lt Col F. Cresswell, VD. 1906–1910

2nd North Canterbury Battalion of Infantry

Lt Col H.S.E. Hobday 1903–1906
Lt Col G.J. Smith 1906–1910

Nelson District Commanders 1860–1911

Lt Col M. Richmond, CB. 1860–1872
Maj N.G. Morse 1872
Capt E. Baigent 1874
Capt J.T. Marshall 1875–1877
Maj A. Pitt 1877–1895
Lt Col A. Pitt 1895–1899
Lt Col Hon J.A. Bonar 1899–1900
Capt (later acting Lt Col) Wolf, GCB. 1900–1906
Maj J.L. Joyce 1906–1911

1st Battalion Nelson Infantry Volunteers

Maj W.S. Littlejohn 1901–1909
Lt Col G.A. Harkness, VD. 1909–1910

2nd Battalion Nelson Infantry Volunteers

Lt Col C.G.F. Morice 1901–1909
Maj J.C. Macfarlane 1909–1910

Marlborough District Commander

Capt W.D.H Baillie 1860–1893

Westland District Commander

Capt J.A. Bonar 1872–1895

Commanding Officers 1st NMWC 1923–1948

Lt Col C.B. Brereton 1923–1924
Lt Col C.E. Butcher 1924–1926
Lt Col G.H. Gray, MC. 1926–1930
Lt Col W.C. Harley 1930–1933
Lt Col W.T. Churchward 1933–1939
Lt Col C.M. Rout, ED. 1939–1942

Commanding Officers 1st NMWC 1948–1964

Lt Col E.F. Richards, DSO, ED. 1948–1954 (Later Hon Col (Lt Col))
Lt Col R.I. Blair, OBE, ED. 1954–1957 (Later Hon Col (Lt Col))
Lt Col R.M.S. Orbell, OBE, ED. 1957–1959
Lt Col D.H. Blyth. 1961–1964 (Later Hon Col (Col))

Commanding Officers 1st Cant (1923–1948)

Lt Col J. Murphy, VD 1923–1925
Lt Col N.R. Wilson, DSO, MC, VD. 1925–1926
Lt Col L.M. Inglis, MC, VD. 1926–1930
Lt Col S.D. Mason, 1930–1936
Lt Col H.K. Kippenberger, 1936–1940 (Later Hon Col (Maj Gen))
Lt Col M. Osborne, ED. 1940–1941
Lt Col W.R. Lascelles. 1941–1943

Commanding Officers 1st Cant (1948–1964)

Lt Col J.R. Williams, DSO. 1948–1954
Lt Col T.B. Morten, DSO, ED. 1954–1959 (Later Hon Col (Brig))
Lt Col J.W. Rolleston, MBE, ED. 1959
Lt Col S.M. Pritchard, MBE, ED. 1959
Lt Col B.H. Palmer, MBE, ED. 1960–1962 (Later Hon Col (Col))
Lt Col M.C. Stanaway, MC. 1962–1964

Commanding Officers 2nd Cant NMWC 1964–2012

Lt Col M.C. Stanaway, MC. 1964
Lt Col R.W.K. Ainge. 1964–1966
Lt Col E.G. Latter, MBE, ED. 1966–1970 (Later Hon Col (Brig))
Lt Col E.H. Poole, ED. 1970–1973 (Later Hon Col (Col))
Lt Col M.J. Blair, MBE, ED. 1973–1976
Lt Col R.E. Menzies, ED. 1976–1979
Lt Col N.A. Koutua, ED. 1979–1982 (Later Hon Col (LtCol))
Lt Col P.V. Coster, OBE, ED. 1982–1986
Lt Col R.G. Milne. 1986–1991
Lt Col P.F. Koorey. 1991–1993
Lt Col G. Hart 1993-1998
Lt Col K. Whitlow 1998-2000
Lt Col G.S. Trengrove, MVO. 2000-2002  (Later promoted to Brig & awarded DSD, ED)
Lt Col R. Keetley 2002-2006
Lt Col N.J.A. Sinclair, ED. 2006-2008
Lt Col G.A. McMillian. 2008–2013

Commanding Officers of 2/4 Battalion RNZIR 2012–Current

Lt Col G.A. McMillian. 2013–2013
Lt Col A.J. Brosnan. (First female C/O) NZIC 2013-2016
Lt Col K. Langston. 2016–2021
Lt Col T. Tuatini. 2021-Current

Honorary Colonels

1911–1964

Maj Gen D.P. Penton, CB, CVO. 13th (North Canterbury) 1911-unknown
Maj Gen E.W.C. Chaytor, KCMG, KCVO, CB. 1st (Canterbury) 1920–1921
12th (Nelson & Malborough) 1920–1921
Canterbury 1921–1923
Nelson Marlborough & West Coast 1923–1939
Col The Hon G.J. Smith, CBE, TD. 1st (Canterbury) 1923-unknown
Maj Gen Sir H. Kippenberger, KBE, CB, DSO & Bar. 1st (Canterbury) 1951–1957
Brig J.T. Burrows, CBE, DSO, ED. 1st (Canterbury) 1957–1964
Col D.J. Fountaine, DSO, MC. ED. 1st (Nelson, Marlborough & West Coast) 1951–1959
Lt Col E.E. Richards, DSO, OBE, ED. 1st (Nelson, Marlborough & West Coast) 1959–1962
Lt Col R.I. Blair, OBE, ED. 1st (Nelson, Marlborough & West Coast) 1963–1964

2nd Cant NMWC RNZIR Honorary Colonels 1964–2012

Brig J.T. Burrows, CBE, DSO, ED. 1964–1966
Brig T.B. Morten, CBE, DSO, ED. 1966–1971
Col T.F. Hegglun, OBE, ED. 1971–1977
Col B.H. Palmer, ED. 1977–1982
Col D.H. Blyth. 1982–1987
Brig E.G. Latter, MBE, ED. 1987–1992
Col E.H. Poole, ED. 1992–
Brig R.E. Menzies, CBE, ED
Lt Col N.H. Kotua, ED. -2012
Lt Col Cutler 2012–2016 -2/4 RNZIR
Lt Col G. Hart 2016–Current-2/4 RNZIR

Chaplains of the Regiment

Chap Rev H.R. Dewsbury. No1 North Canterbury Bn (1910)
ChCl IV Fr J.F.M. Barra. 2nd Bn Canterbury Regt (1914–18)
ChCl IV Rev W. Bullock. 2nd Bn Canterbury Regt (1914–18)
ChCl IV Rev Fr P.F. Cullen. 2nd Bn Canterbury Regt (1914–18)
ChCl III Rev F. Dunnage. 2nd Bn Canterbury Regt (1914–18)
ChCl IV Rev C.M. Jones. 3rd Bn Canterbury Regt (1914–18)
ChCl IV Rev J.A. Lush. 2nd Bn Canterbury Regt (1914–18)
ChCl III Rev Fr J.J. McMenamin. 2nd Bn Canterbury Regt (1914–18)-Killed in Action-Messines, 8 June 1917.
ChCl IV Rev Fr P. Flynn. 2nd Bn Canterbury Regt (1914–18)
ChCl IV Rev E.D. Rice. 2nd Bn Canterbury Regt (1914–18)
ChCl IV Rev G.T. Robson MC, OBE. 1st Bn Canterbury Regt (1914–18)
ChCl III Rev T.F. Taylor. 1st Bn Canterbury Regt (1914–18)
ChCl III Rev C.E.O'H. Tobin. 1st Bn Canterbury Regt (1914–18)
ChCl II Rev F.O. Dawson, OBE. 20th Battalion (1939–45)
Chcl IV Rev H.I. Hopkins, OBE. (P.O.W) 20th Battalion (1939–45)
ChCl II Rev G.A.D. Spence, OBE, MC. 20th Battalion (1939–45)
ChCl II Rev Fr L.P. Spring, OBE. 20th Battalion (1939–45)
ChCl IV Rev J.S. Strang. 20th & 26th Battalion (1939–45)
ChCl IV Rev R.J. Griffiths, MBE. 23rd Battalion (1939–45)
ChCl III Rev H.F. Harding, DSO, MBE. 23rd Battalion (1939–45)
ChCl III Rev S.C. Read (P.O.W.) 23rd Battalion (1939–45)
ChCl IV Rev N.F. Sansom. 23rd Battalion (1939–45)
ChCl IV Rev. R.B. Spence. 23rd Battalion (1939–45)
ChCl IV Rev J.G.B. Talbot. 23rd Battalion (1939–45)
ChCl III Rev Fr J.L. Kingan. MC. 26th Battalion (1939–45)
ChCl III Rev J.R. Nairn. 26th Battalion (1939–45)
ChCl III Rev H.S. Scott. 26th Battalion (1939–45)
ChCl III Rev Fr J.W. Rodgers. 30th Battalion (1939–45)
ChCl III Rev Fr W.E. Ryan. 30th Battalion (1939–45)
ChCl IV Rev H.W. West. 30th Battalion (1939–45)
ChCl IV Rev. W.D. Whelan. 6th Canterbury Regt (1939–45)

ChCl III Rev H.E. Rowe. 1st NMWC
ChCl IV Rev F.G. Glen. 2nd CantNWMC
ChCl IV Rev K.J. Taylor. 2nd CantNWC
ChCl IV Rev F. Greg. 2nd CantNWMC
ChCl III Rev Fr B.J. Fennessy, ED * 2nd CantNMWC
ChCl III Rev H.M.L. Kirk ED 2nd CantNMWC (Later appointed Lead Chaplain Southern Area, 1st NZ Bde Linton Camp)

Battle honours
The regiment perpetuates the battle honours awarded to the 23rd, 26th, 30th and 37th Battalions, Second New Zealand Expeditionary Force.

South Africa 1900–02
First World War:
Somme 1916, 1918,
Messines 1917,
Ypres 1917,
Passchendaele,
Hindenburg Line,
France and Flanders 1916–18,
ANZAC,
Gallipoli 1915,
Suez Canal,
Egypt 1915–16
Second World War:
Greece 1941,
Crete,
Sidi Rezegh,
Minquar Qaim,
El Alamein,
Tebaga Gap,
Orsogna,
Cassino I,
The Senio,
South Pacific 1942–44
Solomons,
Vella Lavella,
Green Islands

1st Canterbury Regiment Battle Honours

South Africa 1902.
Egypt 1915-16,
ANZAC,
Gallipoli 1915,
Somme 1916–18,
Messines 1917,
Ypres,
Hindenberg Line,
Selle,
France and Flanders

1st Nelson Marlborough West Coast Regiment Battle Honours

South Africa 1900-1902,
Egypt 1915-16,
Landings on ANZAC,
ANZAC,
Gallipoli 1915,
Sari Bair,
Messines 1917,
Hindenburg Line,
Passchendale,
Somme 1916–1918
Suez Canal 1917,
France and Flanders

Alliances
 – The Rifles
 – The Princess of Wales's Royal Regiment (Queen's and Royal Hampshire)
 – The Royal Irish Regiment (27th (Inniskilling) 83rd and 87th and The Ulster Defence Regiment)
 – University of New South Wales Regiment

Freedoms
The regiment was granted the following freedoms:
City of Timaru (1965)
City of Christchurch (1966)
City of Nelson (1969)
Borough of Ashburton
Borough of Greymouth
District of Marlbourgh

Notable members

Captain C.Upham VC and Bar-C Company, 20th Battalion
Sergeant H.J. Nicholas, VC, MM-12th Nelson Company (Killed in Action at Beaudigny 23 October 1918)
Sergeant J.Hinton VC-20th Battalion
Sergeant C.Hulme VC-23rd Battalion
Major General Sir E.W.C. Chaytor, KCMG, KCVO, CB
Major General L.M. Inglis, CB, CBE, DSO, MC, VD, ED
Major General Sir Howard Kippenberger, KBE, CB, DSO & Bar
Brigadier Burrows, CBE, DSO, ED **
Colonel Hon G.J. Smith, CBE, TD. 
Colonel Frank Rennie, CBE, MC-1st Cant, 30th Bn & 37th Bn
Colonel D.J. Foutaine. DSO, MC, ED.-1st NMWC
Lieutenant Colonel N.R. Wilson, DSO, MC, VD-1st NWMC
Lieutenant Colonel F.M. Mitchell, MC.-6th Cant
Lieutenant Colonel T.B. Morten, DSO, ED.-1st Cant
Lieutenant Colonel J.R. Williams, DSO.-1st Cant
Lieutenant Colonel J.B. Mawson MC, ED.-30th Bn
Major G.H. Gray, MC-1st NMWC
Major H.H. Thomason, MM-1st NMWC
Major J.M.C. McLeod MC*-30th Bn 
Major (latter Lt Col), M.C. Stanaway MC-1st NMWC (Awarded in Korea as a captain)
Captain Starnes, DSO (was recommended for a Victoria Cross, but was immediately awarded the DSO)
Captain P.W.G. Spiers, MBE, MC, VD-1st NMWC
Warrant Officer Class II James Godfrey, DCM, MM 13th North Canterbury Regt
Sergeant E.Batchelor DCM and Bar-23rd Battalion
Lance Corporal R.J. Burrell, BEM.-2nd CantNMWC
Private J.D. Ross, MM
Private H. Anderson, MM

Further reading
"Together Onward: A Short History of the Canterbury Regiment, NMWC, and the Second Battalion, 1845–1970", 2RNZIR, King Edward Barracks, Christchurch, 1970
"Marching Onward: The History of the 2nd Battalion (Canterbury, Nelson, Marlborough, West Coast), Royal New Zealand Infantry Regiment, By Brig (rtd) Edward Latter

References

External links
NZ Army Official Website: 2 Cant NMWC

First World War, 1914–1919;
The Canterbury Regiment, 1914–1919
The History of the Canterbury Mounted Rifles 1914–1919

Second World War, 1939–1945;
23 Battalion Official History
26 Battalion Official History
30 Battalion Official History
37 Battalion Official History

Other
2nd Battalion (Canterbury, and Nelson-Marlborough, and West Coast), RNZIR

Infantry regiments of New Zealand
Military units and formations established in 1964
Military units and formations disestablished in 2012